Cuthonidae is a family of sea slugs, aeolid nudibranchs, marine gastropod molluscs in the superfamily Fionoidea.

Taxonomic history
This family was reinstated as a result of a molecular phylogenetics study.

Genera 
Genera within the family Cuthonidae include:
 Bohuslania Korshunova, Lundin, Malmberg, Picton & Martynov, 2018 
 Cuthona Alder & Hancock, 1855

References

External links 
 Tatiana Korshunova, Kennet Lundin, Klas Malmberg, Bernard Picton, Alexander Martynov: First true brackish-water nudibranch mollusc provides new insights for phylogeny and biogeography and reveals paedomorphosis-driven evolution; PLOS|ONE, March 14, 2018